The 42nd Army Corps was an Army corps in the Imperial Russian Army.

Part of
6th Army: 1915 - 1916
Northern Front: 1916 - 1917

References 
 

Corps of the Russian Empire